Antitypona is a genus of leaf beetles in the subfamily Eumolpinae. They are found in Central America and South America.

Species

 Antitypona amapariensis Bechyné & Bechyné, 1961
 Antitypona amoena (Lefèvre, 1885)
 Antitypona angulicollis (Jacoby, 1900)
 Antitypona apicalis (Jacoby, 1881)
 Antitypona apicipennis (Lefèvre, 1884)
 Antitypona caprai Bechyné, 1957
 Antitypona caracasa Bechyné, 1954
 Antitypona cobosi Bechyné, 1954
 Antitypona coeruleata (Lefèvre, 1877)
 Antitypona collaris (Baly, 1859)
 Antitypona demerara Bechyné, 1955
 Antitypona discigera Bechyné, 1951
 Antitypona displicita Bechyné, 1954
 Antitypona diversicornis (Baly, 1878)
 Antitypona dorsata (Baly, 1878)
 Antitypona dorsoplagiata Bechyné, 1955
 Antitypona ecrasia Bechyné, 1955
 Antitypona egleri Bechyné & Bechyné, 1965
 Antitypona ephippium (Lefèvre, 1884)
 Antitypona epiphania Bechyné, 1955
 Antitypona formosa Bechyné & Bechyné, 1969
 Antitypona fulvicornis (Jacoby, 1900)
 Antitypona fulvimana (Jacoby, 1900)
 Antitypona fulvitarsis (Baly, 1878)
 Antitypona generosa (Baly, 1878)
 Antitypona gigas (Jacoby, 1881)
 Antitypona hebe (Baly, 1865)
 Antitypona hebe hebe (Baly, 1865)
 Antitypona hebe maronica Bechyné, 1949
 Antitypona hebe quinquepustulata (Baly, 1865)
 Antitypona histrionalis (Lefèvre, 1884)
 Antitypona humeralis (Jacoby, 1900)
 Antitypona incisella Bechyné, 1953
 Antitypona insularis Bechyné, 1953
 Antitypona ivongioides Bechyné, 1954
 Antitypona janthina (Lefèvre, 1885)
 Antitypona josephina Bechyné, 1953
 Antitypona juengeri Bechyné, 1953
 Antitypona kuscheli Bechyné, 1950
 Antitypona lamellata Bechyné & Bechyné, 1969
 Antitypona lateralis (Baly, 1865)
 Antitypona longicornis Bechyné, 1953
 Antitypona louana Bechyné & Bechyné, 1976
 Antitypona luctuosa (Lefèvre, 1878)
 Antitypona macacoara Bechyné & Bechyné, 1965
 Antitypona multicolor Weise, 1921
 Antitypona nitentula Bechyné, 1953
 Antitypona oedipoda Bechyné & Bechyné, 1976
 Antitypona ornata (Lefèvre, 1885)
 Antitypona ornaticollis Bechyné, 1951
 Antitypona ornaticollis boliviana Bechyné, 1951
 Antitypona ornaticollis ornaticollis Bechyné, 1951
 Antitypona plaumanni Bechyné, 1954
 Antitypona plumbea (Jacoby, 1890)
 Antitypona pulchra (Baly, 1878)
 Antitypona pusilla (Lefèvre, 1888)
 Antitypona pythia Bechyné & Bechyné, 1969
 Antitypona quadrimaculata (Jacoby, 1899)
 Antitypona rubeola Bechyné, 1951
 Antitypona sanguinea (Fauvel, 1861)
 Antitypona scymnoides Bechyné, 1958
 Antitypona semipurpurea (Jacoby, 1890)
 Antitypona septella Bechyné, 1951
 Antitypona specularis (Baly, 1859)
 Antitypona subcostata (Jacoby, 1881)
 Antitypona submetallica (Jacoby, 1890)
 Antitypona tarsata (Baly, 1859)
 Antitypona thoa Bechyné & Bechyné, 1976
 Antitypona variabilis (Jacoby, 1890)
 Antitypona ventralis Bechyné, 1953
 Antitypona venusta (Lefèvre, 1885)
 Antitypona yepezi Bechyné & Bechyné, 1967
 Antitypona zeca Bechyné & Bechyné, 1965

Synonyms:
 Antitypona amabilis (Lefèvre, 1878): moved to Chalcoplacis
 Antitypona anthrax Bechyné, 1951: moved to Chalcoplacis
 Antitypona balyi (Lefèvre, 1885): synonym of Antitypona amoena (Lefèvre, 1885)
 Antitypona bicolora (Jacoby, 1900): moved to Chalcoplacis
 Antitypona bimaculata (Jacoby, 1900): moved to Chalcoplacis
 Antitypona confraterna Bechyné, 1951: moved to Chalcoplacis
 Antitypona dilatata Bechyné, 1950: moved to Chalcoplacis
 Antitypona dimidiata (Jacoby, 1900): moved to Hylax
 Antitypona fulgida (Lefèvre, 1885): moved to Chalcoplacis
 Antitypona minuta (Jacoby, 1881): moved to Spintherophyta
 Antitypona nicteroyensis Bechyné, 1951: moved to Chalcoplacis
 Antitypona progressa Bechyné, 1951: moved to Chalcoplacis
 Antitypona ruficeps (Baly, 1878): synonym of Antitypona hebe (Baly, 1865)
 Antitypona scintillaris (Baly, 1865): synonym of Chalcoplacis tricolor (Fauvel, 1861)
 Antitypona sulcaticeps Bechyné, 1951: moved to Chalcoplacis

References

Eumolpinae
Chrysomelidae genera
Beetles of Central America
Beetles of South America
Taxa named by Julius Weise